Nothobranchius foerschi is a species of killifish in the family Nothobranchiidae. It is endemic to Tanzania.  Its natural habitat is probably temporary pools. The specific name honours the German physician and aquaris Walter Foersch (1932-1993), who was an expert in killifish and was one of the first people to keep and breed this species.

References

Links
 Nothobranchius foerschi on WildNothos

foerschi
Endemic freshwater fish of Tanzania
Taxa named by Rudolf Hans Wildekamp
Taxa named by Heinz Otto Berkenkamp
butterfly nothobranch
Taxonomy articles created by Polbot